Croatian Canadians are Canadian citizens who are of Croatian descent. The community exists in major cities including the Greater Toronto Area, Hamilton, Ottawa, Vancouver, Calgary, Edmonton, Winnipeg, Windsor, Montreal and Waterloo Region.

Popular events celebrated in the Croatian-Canadian community include the Canadian-Croatian Folklore Festival (held in eastern and western Canada) and the Croatian-North American Soccer Tournament.

Demographics
There were approximately 114,880 Canadians of Croatian ethnic origin as reported in the 2011 Census compiled by Statistics Canada, rising to 133,965 by the 2016 Census. Although predominantly found in Ontario, Croatian Canadians are present in most major Canadian cities throughout the country. The ten largest Croatian communities are found in the following cities:

 Toronto, Ontario,: 13,670
 Hamilton, Ontario: 10,110
 Mississauga, Ontario: 9,935
 Calgary,: 5,575
 Edmonton,: 4,175
 Oakville,: 4,045
 Vancouver,: 3,890
 Ottawa,: 3,540
 Burnaby,: 3,225
 Kitchener,: 3,000

The town with the largest percentage of people of Croatian ethnic origin is Kenaston, Saskatchewan - 17.5% of its 285 inhabitants claim Croatian ethnic origin.
Statistics Canada also designates Census Metropolitan Areas in the collection of its data.  The ten Census Metropolitan Areas with the highest concentration of Croatian Canadians are:

 Toronto CMA: 37,460
 Vancouver CMA: 15,670
 Hamilton CMA: 13,655
 Calgary CMA: 6,265
 Edmonton CMA: 5,265
 Montreal CMA: 5,230
 Kitchener-Cambridge-Waterloo CMA: 4,920
 Ottawa CMA: 4,135
 Windsor CMA: 3,925
 Niagara CMA: 3,225

Religious affiliation

Most Croatian Canadians are Roman Catholic who follow the Latin Rite of their ancestors in Croatia and Bosnia and Herzegovina. This is in line with the population in Croatia, which is also majority Catholic. A very small minority of Croatians are Byzantine Rite Roman Catholics. There is also a very small community of Croats who follow Islam, the descendants of those who converted after the 16th century, after the conquest of much of Croatia by the Ottomans.  Communities of Protestants have historically been negligible in Croatia.

Catholicism 

In Canada, the first ethnic Croatian parish was established in Windsor in 1950.  Soon, parishes were established in Toronto (1951), Hamilton (1958), Vancouver (1967), Winnipeg (1968). Today there are ethnic Croatian parishes and missions in seventeen cities in Canada. One of the most prominent Croatian Catholic parishes is the Queen of Peace Catholic Church in Norval, Ontario. The establishment of the parish began in 1976 when community members, under the guidance of the Franciscan Friars, gathered for one evening to discuss the necessity and logistics of creating a place of gathering and cultural and faith building and preservation for the large Croatian immigrant population. In May 1977, 160 acres of property were purchased by the organizing committee with the specific dedication to Croatian Catholics. In the Norval Croatian Centre, as is in many other Croatian Catholic parishes, brochures, books, CDs and other forms of Croatian media are offered.

The Croatian Catholic youth in particular have started and taken part in many faith developments of their own. The Croatian Catholic Youth Group (CCY) is a faith-based group that comes together by schedule to discuss Catholic subjects and strengthen their religious belief. In addition, Mladifest is an annual event started in 2013 by the Queen of Peace Parish and has each year attracted hundreds of young Catholic Croatian to further explore the intersection of their faith and culture. As the event continued to develop over the years, the rotation of it between host parishes started, with the 2013, 2014, and 2015 Mladifest being in Norval, 2016 in Sacred Heart, Milwaukee, Wisconsin, 2017 in Immaculate Heart of Mary, Vancouver, British Columbia, 2018 in Croatian Martys Church, Mississauga, Ontario, and 2019 in Saint Nicholas Tavelic, Montreal, Quebec. It is an event funded by each parishes' members donations and contributions to bake sales, banquets and other events held to amass funds.

Other Christian 

While an overwhelming percentage of Croatians in Canada remain Roman Catholic, there are non-Catholic populations, including Protestants (most of whom have been in Canada for more than one generation) and Eastern Orthodox (the majority of whom are of mixed ethnic background).

Islam 

Previously unorganized Croats of the Muslim faith, with the arrival of eminent physician Asaf Duraković founded the Croatian Islamic Centre on June 23, 1973 in Etobicoke (75 Birmingham Street, Etobicoke, ON M8V 2C3), helped by the Croatian Catholic community. An old Catholic school was bought for 75,000 CAD and readjusted into masjid. Since the old building was in bad condition, a new mosque was built on the site of the old one in 1983.

Today, given changing political affiliations and political pressures from 1990's, and influx of non-Croat option of Bosnian Muslims, the center is now known as the Bosnian Islamic Centre. Despite that, today 4 out of 64 Canadian mosques have the attribute "Croatian". In Croatian Islamic Centre the children are taught the Croatian and Arabic languages, but there also Croatian Islamic newspapers, books, brochures, etc. Croatian Islamic Center called on Muslim governments, organisations, and individuals to press the Yugoslav regime, to end the persecution of Islam and to grant genuin equality of Muslims in Yugoslavia. The director of Centre Kerim Reis wanted that Belgrade releases the Muslim prisoners of conscience and to end to restrictions on the building of mosques. During Yugoslavia, this group often spoke accused Tito's Yugoslavia for practising discrimination both Muslim and Catholic Croats.

Notable Croatian Canadians

Businesspeople
Robert Herjavec - CEO of the Herjavec Group, one Canada's most prominent technology companies
Tihomir Orešković - 11th Prime Minister of Croatia

Politicians
Eve Adams - Liberal MP, Missisauga-Brampton South; born Eve Horvat to Hungarian-Croat parents 
Bob Bratina - former Mayor of Hamilton, 2010–2014; Liberal MP, Hamilton East-Stoney Creek 2015–present
Jan Brown - former Reform/Independent MP Calgary Southeast, 1993-1997
Allan Kerpan - Saskatchewan Party MLA, Carrot River Valley, 2003–present; former Reform MP, Moose Jaw-Lake Centre, 1993-2000
Janko Peric - former Liberal MP, Cambridge, 1993-2004
Peter Sekulic – former Alta Liberal MLA, Edmonton Manning, 1993-1997
Roseanne Skoke - former Liberal MP, Central Nova, 1993-1997
John Sola - former Liberal MPP, 1987–1995
Dave Stupich - former NDP MP, Nanaimo-Cowichan 1988-1993; former B.C. NDP MLA, 1963-1969; 1972-1988
Ruža Tomašić - police officer and politician, Member of the European Parliament
Berry Vrbanovic - mayor of Kitchener, 2014–present; Kitchener City Councillor, 1994-2014; Liberal Party candidate for Kitchener Centre in the 1999 Ontario Election.    
Lynne Yelich - Canadian Alliance/Conservative MP, Blackstrap, 2000–2015

Scientists
Asaf Durakovic - physician and expert in nuclear medicine and depleted uranium; poet

Arts and entertainment 
 Michael Bublé - singer
 Steve Bacic - actor
 Frank Cvitanovich - documentary filmmaker
 Ivan Hrvatska - singer
 Alicia Josipovic - actor
 Stana Katic - actor
 Josip Novakovich - writer
 Daniella Pavičić - singer and songwriter
 Teresa Toten - writer

Athletes
Nikola Andrijević - soccer player 
Sandra Bezić - figure skater
Val Bezić - figure skater
Željko Bilecki - soccer player
Joseph Cattarinich - hockey player
George Chuvalo - boxer
Nick Dasović - soccer player
Great Antonio - strength athlete
Tony Hrkac - hockey player
Dejan Jakovic - soccer player
Ante Jazić - soccer player
Dan Kordić - hockey player
John Kordić - hockey player
Frank Mahovlich - hockey player
Peter Mahovlich - hockey player
Tony Mandarich - NFL player
Phil Oresković - hockey player
Matt Pavelich - hockey player
George Pesut - hockey player
Brian Sakić - hockey player
Joe Sakić - hockey player
Cory Sarich - hockey player
Paul Spoljarić - baseball player
Marc-Édouard Vlasić - hockey player
Bo Horvat - hockey player

Political activists
 Madeline-Ann Aksich
 Gojko Šušak

Other
 Mato Dukovac - World War II fighter ace
 Zvonko Vranesic - Master of Chess
 George "Stan Stasiak" Stipich - professional wrestler

See also 
 Croats
 List of Croats

References

External links 
 History of Croatian Canadians
 Statistics Canada

 
Canada
Croatia
Croatian